Tommy Trojan, officially known as the Trojan Shrine, is one of the most recognizable figures of school pride at the University of Southern California. The life-size bronze statue of a Trojan warrior stands in the center of campus and serves as a popular meeting spot, as well as a centerpiece for a number of campus events. It is the most popular unofficial mascot of the university.

History
The Trojan Shrine was sculpted by Roger Noble Burnham, who used USC football players such as Russ Saunders, Ernie Pinckert, Henry Becker, Larry Stevens and John Ward as visual references for the statue. It was unveiled during the University's 50th Jubilee in 1930. It cost $10,000 to build, after which a $1 surcharge was added onto the season football tickets in order to help offset this cost.

The original name suggested for the statue was The Spirit of Troy, but that name went to the school's marching band.

On August 17, 2017, during the USC village grand opening, the Hecuba, Queen of Troy statue was unveiled to the public. This large statue serves as the female counterpart to Tommy Trojan and represents the Women of USC.

Features
Tommy Trojan is located at the core of the campus and often serves as a meeting ground for students and visitors. Many people take pictures with the statue. The Shrine is surrounded by the Bovard Administration Building, Ronald Tutor Campus Center, and Alumni Park. Trousdale Parkway passes next to the statue. USC offers the Tommy Cam, which is a live image of the statue, with daily time-lapse videos. Inscribed on the base of the statue are the five attributes of the ideal Trojan: Faithful, Scholarly, Skillful, Courageous and Ambitious. On the reverse is a plaque bearing a quote by Virgil: "Here are provided seats of meditative joy, where shall rise again the destined reign of Troy."

Vandalism

USC's cross-town rival UCLA had vandalized Tommy Trojan (often by painting the statue in the UCLA colors of blue and gold) during the week of the annual USC-UCLA football game. To prevent this, university officials now cover the statue during that week to protect it from UCLA vandals. Students also gather for Save Tommy Nite on the night before the game against UCLA. In addition, members of the Trojan Knights maintain an all-night vigil around Tommy Trojan during the rivalry week to further deter would-be vandals.

Identity
Many people identify Tommy Trojan as the symbol of the university. However, Tommy Trojan is not USC's official mascot; that title belongs to Traveler, a white Andalusian horse. Before Traveler, a real local dog named George Tirebiter served as the unofficial mascot. A statue of the dog is also a feature of the campus.

References

External links

About.usc.edu
Photographs featuring inscriptions from the base - Tommy Trojan, the Mascot of USC

Traditions at the University of Southern California
1930 sculptures
Bronze sculptures in California
Statues in Los Angeles
1930 establishments in California
Sculptures of men in California
Vandalized works of art in California
Outdoor sculptures in California